The Roman Catholic Diocese of Warri is a diocese located in the city of Warri in the Ecclesiastical province of Benin City in Nigeria.

History
 March 10, 1964: Established as Diocese of Warri from the Diocese of Benin City

Special churches
The Cathedral is Sacred Heart Cathedral in Warri.

Bishops
Bishops of Warri
 Lucas Olu Chukwuka Nwaezeapu (1964.03.10 – 1983.09.10)
 Edmund Joseph Fitzgibbon, S.P.S. (1991.08.31 – 1997.03.03)
 Richard Anthony Burke, S.P.S. (1997.03.03 - 2007.12.24), appointed Archbishop of Benin City
 John Okeoghene Afareha (29 March 2010 – 18 April 2022)

Coadjutor Bishop
Richard Anthony Burke, S.P.S. (1995-1997)

Auxiliary Bishop
John ’Oke Afareha (1997-2010), appointed Bishop here

Other priests of this diocese who became bishops
Joseph O. Egerega, appointed Vicar Apostolic of Bomadi in 1997

Deaneries

Warri Deanery
	Sacred Heart, Cathedral.
	St. Paul, Odion.
	Annunciation, Ogunu.
	Holy Family, Edjeba.
	Assumption, Idama.
	Escravos Catholic Community.
	St. Theresa's,  Ubeji.
      ANNUNCIATION Parish Bazunu
      Our Lady Queen of Nigeria, Apala

Effurun Deanery
	Mother of the Redeemer, Effurun.
	Corpus Christi, Japka Road.
	St. Jude, G.R.A.
	Seat of wisdom, P.T.I.
	St. Anthony, Ugborikoko.
	St. Ambrose, Ekpan.
	Blessed Tansi, Ugboroke.
	St. John Vianney, New Layout.
	pope John 11, Army Barracks.
	Our Lady Queen of Peace, Navy Barracks.
	Nativity, Alegbo.
	Holy Trinity, Ugbomro.
	Our Lady of the Rosary, Ebrumede.
	St. Cyprian, Agaga oil field Road, Effurun.

Udu Deanery
	St. Michael's, DSC.
	St. Paul's, Enerhen.
	St. Mary's, Ovwian.
	St. Anthony's Ogbe-Ijoh.
	St. Benedict's Oruhwhorun.
	St. Peter's, Ekete Inland.
   St. Thomas, Otokutu
   st. Mathew, aladja

Sapele Deanery
	St.  Bridget, Amuogodo, Sapele.
	St. Patick's, Sapele.
	St. Martin's, Gana - Sapele.
	St. Mary, Koko.
	st. Felix, Oghara.
	Sacred Heart, Abraka.
	St. Paul's Chaplaincy, Abraka.
	Holy Trinity, Oria-Abraka.
	St  Williams, Orerokpe.
	St Partick’S Eku.
	St.  Mary Amukpe.
	St. Peter's Okuokoko.
	St. Theresa, Ovu Inland.
       St. Theresa, Osubi.

Ole Deanery
	St. John the Baptist, Oleh.
	Holy Trinity, Ozoro.
	St. Matthias, Uzere.
	St. Gregory's, Olomoro.
	St. Anthony, Oro-Owhe.
	Annunciation Chaplaincy, Ozoro.
	St. Peter's Chaplaincy, Oleh.
       St. Monica's Aviara
       St. Mary's  Irri

Kwale Deanery
	St. John's, Abbi.
	St. Peter's,  Aboh. 
	St. Leo, Ashaka.
	Holy Rosary, Utagha-Ogbe. 
	St. Michael Umutu. 
	Our Lady of Lourdes, Ndemili.
	Christ the King, Obiaruku.
	St. Theresa's, Obinomba.
	St. Joseph's Aragba Orogun.
       corpus christi, Obiaruku

Ughelli Deanery
	SS Peter & Paul Ughelli.
	St. Michael's Otorvwodo. 
	St. John's Ewreni.
	St.Peter’s Eghwu.
	St. Patrick's Okwagbe.
	Assumption Ekuigbo.
	Christ the king Okpara-inland.
	HolySpirit, Ighrekpokpo.
	St. Joseph's Okpare Olomu.
	St. Joseph ‘s Oviri – Olomu.
	St. Gregory's Agbarho.
	Descent of the Holy Spirit, Agbarho.
	St. Theresa's, Otoroh-Agbon
	St. James, Kokori Inland.
	St. Joseph's, Aragba Orogun.
	Immaculate Conception, Usiefurun.
	St. Theresa's Oloho Avenue.

See also
Roman Catholicism in Nigeria

Sources
 GCatholic.org Information
 Catholic Hierarchy
 Eje 
 s Gist News 

Warri 
Christian organizations established in 1964 
Roman Catholic dioceses and prelatures established in the 20th century 
Roman Catholic Ecclesiastical Province of Benin City